John FitzAlan III (14 September 124618 March 1272), was an English nobleman. He was also Lord and Baron of Clun and Oswestry in the Welsh Marches.

Family
He was the son of John FitzAlan II, Earl of Arundel (1223–1267), and Maud de Verdun, daughter of Theobald le Botiller (or Boteler) and Rohese (or Rohesia) de Verdun. His paternal grandparents were John FitzAlan, Lord of Oswestry and Isabel d'Aubigny.

Marriage
Lord FitzAlan married Isabella Mortimer (died 1292), daughter of Roger Mortimer, 1st Baron Mortimer and Maud de Braose in 1260. They had one son:
 Richard FitzAlan, 1st Earl of Arundel.
They had at least one daughter:
 Matilda (Maud) FitzAlan married firstly, Philip Burnell (died 1294); married secondly, Robert de Brus, Lord of Annandale and Earl of Carrick; married thirdly, Simon de Cricketot.

References 

1246 births
1272 deaths
Burials at Haughmond Abbey
07
John
Marcher lords